Mu Zhongsheng (born July 26, 1991 in Anda) is a Chinese speed-skater.

Mu competed at the 2014 Winter Olympics for China. In the 500 metres he finished 30th overall.

Mu made his World Cup debut in December 2012. As of September 2014, Mu's top World Cup finish is 7th in a pair of B races. His best overall finish in the World Cup is 42nd, in the 500 metres in 2013–14.

References

External links 
 

1991 births
Living people
Chinese male speed skaters
Speed skaters at the 2014 Winter Olympics
Olympic speed skaters of China
People from Anda
Speed skaters at the 2017 Asian Winter Games
21st-century Chinese people